The beach handball tournaments at the 2017 World Games in Wrocław was played between 26 and 29 July. 82 beach handball competitors, from 11 nations, participated in the tournament. The beach handball competition took place at P5 Complex in east cluster.

Qualification

Men's tournament

Women's tournament

Schedule

Men's tournament

Group A

Group B

Knockout stage

5th–8th place play-offs

Final ranking

Women's tournament

Group A

Group B

Knockout stage

5th–8th place play-offs

Final ranking

References

External links
 Results book

2017 World Games
2017
2017 in handball
2017